Ulmbach may refer to:

Ulmbach (Kinzig), a river of Hesse, Germany, tributary of the Kinzig
Ulmbach (Lahn), a river of Hesse, Germany, tributary of the Lahn
Peciu Nou (German name Ulmbach), a commune in Timiș County, Romania
Ulmbach, a district of the town Steinau an der Straße in Hesse, Germany